Klov is a historical neighbourhood in the Ukrainian capital Kyiv. Nowadays Klov is located in the administrative Pecherskyi District.

The Klovskiy Monastery was built in this area in the 11th century, but was destroyed in 1240 by Batu Khan's army.

The main streets of Klov are Mechnikova Vulytsia and Klovsky Uzviz, where the 18th-century Klov Palace (which hosts the Supreme Court of Ukraine) is situated.

Public transportation
 Klovska metro station.

Landmarks
 Klov Palace

External links 

 Клов in Wiki-Encyclopedia Kiev  

Neighborhoods in Kyiv
Pecherskyi District
Pechersk, Kyiv
National Landmarks in Kyiv